The 1996 Individual Long Track World Championship was the 26th edition of the FIM speedway Individual Long Track World Championship. The event was held on 8 September 1996 in Herxheim in Germany.

The world title was won by Gerd Riss of Germany for the second time. It was the last individual championship with the final being held as a one off meeting. As from 1997 it would be contested under a Grand Prix system (a series of races).

Final Classification 

 E = eliminated (no further ride)
 ef = engine failure

References 

1996
Speedway competitions in Germany
Motor
Motor